The 2022–23 Montana Grizzlies basketball team represented the University of Montana in the 2022–23 NCAA Division I men's basketball season. The Grizzlies, led by ninth-year head coach Travis DeCuire, played their home games at Dahlberg Arena in Missoula, Montana as members of the Big Sky Conference.

Previous season
The Grizzlies finished the 2021–22 season 18–14, 11–9 in Big Sky play to finish in a tie for seventh place. In the Big Sky tournament, they defeated by Weber State in the quarterfinals.

Roster

Schedule and results 

|-
!colspan=12 style=""| Non-conference regular season

|-
!colspan=12 style=""| Big Sky regular season

|-
!colspan=12 style=| 

Source

References

Montana Grizzlies basketball seasons
Montana Grizzlies
Montana Grizzlies basketball
Montana Grizzlies basketball